The Jess Valley Schoolhouse, in Modoc County, California near Likely, California, was listed on the National Register of Historic Places in 1999.

It faces south, is front gabled and has gable returns and
corner boards. Its original shake roof was replaced with tin.

It was built by Orville and Gus Sweeney who probably also designed it, though its "design is typical of one-room schools built throughout the country in the late 1800s and early 1900s."

References

One-room schoolhouses in California
Schools in California
National Register of Historic Places in Modoc County, California
1900 establishments in California